The goanna fish, Australian halosaur, or common halosaur, Halosaurus pectoralis, is a halosaur of the genus Halosaurus, found in the south west Pacific Ocean.

References
 
 Tony Ayling & Geoffrey Cox, Collins Guide to the Sea Fishes of New Zealand,  (William Collins Publishers Ltd, Auckland, New Zealand 1982) 

Halosauridae
Deep sea fish
Fish described in 1926